Guastatoya is a city in Guatemala. It is the capital and largest city of the department of El Progreso. The Guastatoya Water Park is located in the city. It is situated 73 km from the city of Guatemala. The city was leveled in 1976 from an earthquake with a moment magnitude of 7.5.

Sports
Deportivo Guastatoya football club play in the first tier of Guatemalan football. Their home venue is the Estadio David Cordón Hichos.

References

External links
 Interactive department map
Guastatoya.org Ultimas Noticias de Guastatoya y El Progreso

Municipalities of the El Progreso Department